Chris Kuper (born December 19, 1982) is a former American football offensive guard for the Denver Broncos of the National Football League (NFL). The Broncos selected him in the fifth round of the 2006 NFL Draft. He played college football for the University of North Dakota. He is currently the offensive line coach for the Minnesota Vikings.

High school career
Kuper played high school football at A. J. Dimond High School in Anchorage, Alaska where he helped the Lynx win the 2001 ASAA Large Schools State Championship.

As a senior, Kuper finished just behind Matt Gittlein of Wasilla High School as the state's Lineman of the Year.

College career
He played college football for the North Dakota Fighting Sioux. He was a three-year starter, awarded all-conference and All American honors since his junior campaign.

Professional playing career

2006 NFL Draft
Projected to go undrafted by Sports Illustrated, who criticized his lack of "balance, body control and ability in space," Kuper was ranked as the No. 28 offensive guard available in the 2006 NFL Draft. Kuper was eventually selected in the fifth round, 161st overall, by the Denver Broncos. He was the highest selected North Dakota lineman since Todd Thomas in 1981.

Denver Broncos
Kuper started 79-of-90 games played (68 at right guard) while playing his entire eight-year NFL career with the Broncos.

On June 4, 2010, the Broncos announced that they had signed Kuper to a five-year deal worth $25.5 million. The new contract made him the second-highest-paid offensive lineman in Broncos' history, second only to former left tackle Matt Lepsis.

In 2010, the Denver Broncos announced that Kuper had been selected as co-captain of the Broncos offense, along with Kyle Orton and Daniel Graham.

During the regular season finale in 2011 against the Kansas City Chiefs, Kuper suffered a gruesome broken ankle that ended his season. That season Chris Kuper made the Pro Bowl but withdrew due to the injury and needed surgery.

A three-time captain, Kuper was recipient of the Ed Block Courage Award in 2012 as voted on by his teammates.

Kuper retired on March 11, 2014.

Coaching career 
During the 2015 high school football season Kuper was as offensive line coach at Columbine High School in Littleton, Colorado.

On January 23, 2016, Kuper was hired by Miami Dolphins as offensive quality control coach. He then spent two seasons (2017–18) as the assistant offensive line coach for Miami.

On January 22, 2019, the Denver Broncos hired Kuper as their assistant offensive line coach.

With the firing of Vic Fangio from the Broncos Kuper was hired by Kevin O'Connell to be the offensive line coach for the Minnesota Vikings.

References

External links
UND Football bio
Denver Broncos bio
Kuper not letting broken right hand block opportunity

1982 births
Living people
Players of American football from Anchorage, Alaska
American football offensive guards
North Dakota Fighting Hawks football players
Denver Broncos players
Minnesota Vikings coaches
Ed Block Courage Award recipients